Testis-expressed protein 9 is a protein that in humans is encoded the TEX9 gene. TEX9 that encodes a 391-long amino acid protein containing two coiled-coil regions. The gene is conserved in many species and encodes orthologous proteins in eukarya, archaea, and one species of bacteria. The function of TEX9 is not yet fully understood, but it is suggested to have ATP-binding capabilities.

Gene

Locus
TEX9 is located at 15q21.3 and has 18 exons. However, some exons overlap; therefore, there are only 13 distinguishable exons in the human genome. TEX9 is on the sense strand and spans from base 56,365,573 to 56,428,441. TEX9 is located in the gene neighborhood of CD24P2, RFX7, MNS1, and HMGB1P33.

Transcription Regulation 
The promoter for TEX9 was determined using 19 supporting transcripts to be GXP_7531542, spanning from base 56,364,254 to base 56,365,775 on the sense strand of chromosome 15. A number of transcription factors with a matrix similarity greater than or equal to 0.780 that are predicted to regulate transcription of TEX9 are listed below with their respective binding site:

Expression 
The expression of TEX9 is highest in the testis, followed by the thyroid, duodenum, and kidney, although other tissues have been shown to express TEX9. TEX9 is expected to have a subcellular localization in the cytoplasm or nucleus.

mRNA

Characteristics of Isoform 1 
Isoform 1 of TEX9 has a 5' UTR region of 27 base pairs and a 3' UTR region of 356 base pairs. The transcript is 1,559 base pairs long.

Additional Primary Sequence and Variants (Isoforms) 
Less common isoforms of TEX9 include isoforms: 2, X1, X2, X3, X4, X5, and X6.

Protein 
The theoretical molecular weight of the 391 amino acid TEX9 protein is 45kDa and the theoretical pI is 6. However, the experimental molecular weight has been shown to be ~55kDa.

Domains, Motifs, and Secondary Structure
The most pronounced domains in TEX9 are the two coiled-coil regions, which include amino acids 32-59 and 194-351. Repetitive domains within the protein include ALEE (34-37 and 302-305) and EKYK (251-254 and 307-310). TEX9 has more glutamate, lysine, and glutamine residues and less glycine residues compared to a typical human protein.

Post-translational Modifications
TEX9 has been shown to be phosphorylated at tyrosine (Y) residues 85 and 264, and have a ubiquitylation site at the lysine (K) residue at 159. It is predicted that there are multiple other phosphorylation, glycation, 0-beta-GlcNAc, and SUMO protein attachment sites.

Tertiary Structure  

TEX9's two coiled-coil regions make up its tertiary structure and can be visualized using the predicted structure from Phyre2. Shown on the structure are the two known phosphorylated sites and one ubiquitylation site.

Quaternary Structure and Protein Interactions 
TEX9 has been experimentally determined to have interactions including coiled-coil containing 112 (CCDC112), chromosome 20 open reading frame 112 (C20orf112), and nucleolar protein 4 (NOL4). Textmining has suggested that TEX9 also interacts with olfactory receptor, family 4, subfamily C, member 3, odorant receptor (OR4C3). Other interactions include gene products of human genes NOL4-2 (at an unknown location), GOGA2 (in the cis-Golgi network membrane, spindle pole of cytoskeleton, and ER-Golgi intermediate compartment membrane), and KDM1A (in the nucleus). Another proposed interaction between TEX9 involves attachment with the SUMO protein, which has a molecular weight of 11kDa. The realized MW of TEX9 is 55kDa but the theoretical MW is 45kDa, which provides evidence for this interaction.

Homology and Evolution

Paralogs 
There are no paralogs of TEX9 in humans.

Orthologs 
TEX9 has homologs in over 260 other organisms, including vertebrates, invertebrates, archaea, and one species of bacteria. TEX9 has been found in all clades of organisms except land plants.

The relative rate of change for TEX9 is fairly slow compared to fibrinogen and beta-globin, but not as slow as cytochrome c.

Homologous Domains 
TEX9 sequences that are most conserved between humans and other organisms are found within the two coiled-coil regions, where some amino acids are conserved in vertebrates, invertebrates, and microorganisms. The bacterial ortholog is most similar to vertebrates than invertebrates or microorganisms.

Phylogeny 

All of the orthologs of TEX9 are derived from the same common ancestor except the gene found in Chlamydia, which is thought to have transferred from humans into the bacterium.

Clinical significance

Pathology 
No diseases have been shown to be directly linked to TEX9, but some correlations have been found regarding estrogen receptor knockdown and increased TEX9 expression as well as colorectal cancer cells with decreased TEX9 expression.

Disease Association 
Reduced expression of TEX9 has been shown to boost tumor growth in immunocompetent mice but not in immunocompromised mice. This result suggested that TEX9 may function as a tumor antigen in some tumors. Mutations of the TEX9 protein have been found in 1-2% of tumors taken from certain cancers, including endometrial, head and neck, colorectal, and squamous lung.

References

Proteins
Human genes